Washington Township is one of fourteen townships in Clinton County, Indiana, United States. As of the 2010 census, its population was 1,098 and it contained 465 housing units.  The township was named for President George Washington.

History
Before Clinton County existed, all of its territory, along with a small piece of what's now northern Boone County, was from 1828 to 1830 part of Tippecanoe County and known as Washington Township.  When Clinton County was founded, this name was retained for the township then most settled.  As established on May 15, 1830, it included all of Perry Township (which was cut off in 1834) and the south half of Madison (made separate in 1835).

William Clark, the first white settler to come to this area, arrived in 1826 and built a cabin just north of what later would become Jefferson.  David Kilgore and family arrived the next year and settled nearby.

Geography

Unincorporated towns
 Fickle
 Jefferson

Adjacent townships
 Ross Township (north)
 Center Township (east)
 Union Township (east)
 Jackson Township (southeast)
 Perry Township (south)
 Lauramie Township, Tippecanoe County (west)
 Sheffield Township, Tippecanoe County (west)
 Madison Township (northwest)

Major highways
  Interstate 65
  U.S. Route 421
  Indiana State Road 38

Cemeteries
The township contains three cemeteries: Abbot, Jefferson and Providence.

References
 United States Census Bureau cartographic boundary files
 U.S. Board on Geographic Names

Townships in Clinton County, Indiana
Townships in Indiana
1830 establishments in Indiana
Populated places established in 1830